Badepurura is a village of the Bhaluka Upazila in Mymensingh District in Bangladesh.

Location
Badepurura is located in Dhitpur Union in Bhaluka Upazila at Mymensingh district of Bangladesh.

Distance
Road distance of Badepurura from Bhaluka via voraduba is 7.8 km.

Road
First one have to arrive at voraduba Bus stand which is located on Dhaka-Mymensigh-Highway (4.8 km north of Bhaluka). Then travel 3 km east through Purura Road to reach Badepurura.

Education
Badepurua Girls Dakhil Madrasah is said to be the oldest and most famous school in Badepurura, founded in 1990 by Mohammad Ali sheikh, Fazlul Haque Khan.  They also gave utmost importance to girls education and established. West Badepurura Govt Primary School, Badepurura Govt Primary School these are govt schools of this area. There are also Principle Fazlul Haque Khan Hafizia Madrasah which is private madrasah.

References 

Bhaluka Upazila
Villages in Mymensingh District